George Guest CBE FRCO (9 February 1924 – 20 November 2002) was a Welsh organist and choral conductor.

Birth and early life 

George Guest was born in Bangor, Gwynedd. His father was an organist and Guest assisted him by acting as organ blower. He became a chorister at Bangor Cathedral and subsequently at Chester Cathedral, where he took organ lessons from the sub-organist, Dr. Roland Middleton.  He passed the examinations for ARCO in 1940 and FRCO in 1942. By this time he had become the organist and choirmaster of Connah's Quay parish church, Flintshire.

Being proud of his Welsh roots, from the 1970s onwards, Guest took a personal interest in the Cambridge University Welsh Society (Cymdeithas Y Mabinogi), sponsoring many of its events and providing a welcome face for Welsh students away from home.

At the age of 18 he was called up for military service, and joined the Royal Air Force, being posted to India in 1945.  On leaving the services in 1947 he took up the post of sub-organist at Chester Cathedral.  The cathedral organist, Malcolm Boyle, encouraged him to apply for the organ scholarship at St John's College, Cambridge, for which he was successful.

At Cambridge he studied under Robin Orr, who had served as organist and choirmaster at St. John's College since 1938.  In Guest's final year as Organ Scholar, Robin Orr announced that he intended to retire, and the College Council offered the post to Guest, who took over the position in 1951.

Organist and Choirmaster at St John's College 

Within five years of Guest becoming organist and choirmaster, the whole future of the choir at St. John's College came into question, with the proposed closure of the day school which provided the choristers. Guest, with the support of his predecessor, persuaded the College to fund a Choir School.

Under George Guest's direction, the choir built up a formidable reputation, challenging the supremacy of the choir of King's College, Cambridge. Guest introduced a more "continental" tone into the choir, as George Malcolm was doing at Westminster Cathedral.

The choir began broadcasting on the BBC in the early 1950s and started making recordings in 1958.  By the time of Guest's retirement in 1991, the choir had recorded sixty LPs or CDs under his direction.

For many years from 1972 the BBC broadcast Evensong from St. John's College on every Ash Wednesday, and the Advent Carol Service each year since 1981. During George Guest's tenure, the choir undertook many overseas tours.

In 1987 Guest was appointed Commander of the Order of the British Empire (CBE) in the Queen's Birthday Honours.

Herbert Howells and Michael Tippett are among the many composers who wrote liturgical settings for the St. John's College choir whilst George Guest was organist and choirmaster. They also include the French composer Jean Langlais, who wrote a setting of the psalm Beatus vir for the choir: a rare occurrence of a Continental composer writing for the English cathedral tradition.

Organ Scholars who studied under George Guest include:

 Sir David Lumsden (Southwell Minster, New College, Oxford, Principal of the Royal Academy of Music, London)
 Brian Runnett (organist, Norwich Cathedral)
 Jonathan Bielby (organist, Wakefield Cathedral)
 Jonathan Rennert (St Michael's, Cornhill)
 David Hill (choral director) (sub-organist, Durham Cathedral; organist, Westminster Cathedral; organist, Winchester Cathedral; organist and choirmaster, St John's College, Cambridge; now Chief Conductor, BBC Singers)
 Robert Huw Morgan (University Organist, Stanford Memorial Church)
 Adrian Lucas (organist, Worcester Cathedral)
 Andrew Lumsden (Southwark Cathedral, Westminster Abbey, Lichfield Cathedral, Winchester Cathedral)
 Sir Stephen Cleobury (King's College, Cambridge)
 John Scott (St Paul's Cathedral, London, and subsequently St Thomas Fifth Avenue, New York City)
 Andrew Nethsingha (Truro Cathedral; Gloucester Cathedral; Organist and Director of Music, St John's College, Cambridge)

Miscellaneous 

George Guest was a guest on Desert Island Discs in 1976 (http://www.bbc.co.uk/radio4/features/desert-island-discs/castaway/a5168c08#p009n0jz).
He was a lifelong supporter of Chester City FC.
The famous British baritone Simon Keenlyside was a chorister and subsequently a choral scholar in the choir of St John's College, Cambridge while George Guest was the choirmaster there.  Actor Clive Mantle was another chorister at St. John's.

References

obituary The Guardian
Guest, George (1994) A Guest at Cambridge, Paraclete Press .

External links
Interview with George Guest, 3 September 1986

1924 births
2002 deaths
Fellows of St John's College, Cambridge
Alumni of St John's College, Cambridge
Commanders of the Order of the British Empire
Welsh classical organists
British male organists
Cathedral organists
People from Gwynedd
People from Bangor, Gwynedd
People educated at Friars School, Bangor
Fellows of the Royal College of Organists
Welsh choral conductors
British male conductors (music)
20th-century organists
20th-century British conductors (music)
20th-century British male musicians
Royal Air Force personnel of World War II
Male classical organists